The Green Flame is a 1964 Soviet comedy film directed by Villen Azarov.

Plot 
The film tells about the good-natured taxi driver Sergey and his trip around the city on the Moskvich.

Cast 
 Aleksei Kuznetsov as Sergey Kuznetsov
 Svetlana Savyolova as Ira Savyolova
 Anatoliy Papanov as Boris Zhmurkin (as A. Papanov)
 Tatyana Bestayeva as Lena (as T. Bestayeva)
 Ivan Ryzhov as Vasiliy Stepanovich (as I. Ryzhov)
 Vsevolod Sanaev as Pensioner (as V. Saneyev)
 Vladimir Rautbart as Gruzin (as V. Rautbart)
 Vyacheslav Nevinnyy as Vikharyev (as V. Nevinnyy)

References

External links 
 

1964 films
1960s Russian-language films
Soviet comedy films
1964 comedy films
Soviet black-and-white films
Soviet teen films